Kolkata, also known as "Calcutta", is the capital city of the Indian state of West Bengal.

Calcutta may also refer to:

Places
 Kolkata district, an administrative district in West Bengal, India
 Calcutta, Indiana, U.S.
 Calcutta, Ohio, United States
 Calcutta, West Virginia, United States
 Calcutta, Suriname
 Calcutta, Belize
 Black Hole of Calcutta, an 18th century dungeon in Fort William, Calcutta

Film
 Calcutta (1947 film), a film noir starring Alan Ladd
 Calcutta (1969 film), a documentary film by Louis Malle
 Calcutta 71 (1971 film), a film by Mrinal Sen
 Calcutta trilogy (disambiguation)
 Calcutta, a Tamil film dubbed from Telugu film Choodalani Vundi

Schools
University of Calcutta
Calcutta Boys' School
Calcutta Girls' High School
Calcutta Institute of Engineering and Management
Calcutta International School
Calcutta National Medical College
Calcutta Public School
Calcutta School of Music
Calcutta Technical School

Music
Calcutta (band), American alternative rock band
"Calcutta" (song)", 1961 instrumental by Lawrence Welk
"Calcutta (Taxi Taxi Taxi)", 1998 song by Dr. Bombay (Jonny Jakobsen)
Calcutta, Italian singer-songwriter, born Edoardo D'Erme

Military topics
 , five ships of the Royal Navy
 Siege of Calcutta, battle between the armies Britain and the Nawab of Bengal in the 18th century

Other uses
Calcutta Club
 Calcutta auction, a method of allocating gambling bets by auction
 The Calcutta Cup, an annual rugby match between England and Scotland
 Short S.8 Calcutta, flying boat

See also
 Oh! Calcutta!, a theatrical revue
 
 
 Kolkata (disambiguation)